The National Farmers' Federation (NFF) is an Australian non-profit membershipbased organization that represents farmers and the agricultural sector in Australia. Historically, NFF was a key player in a number of industrial relations disputes, including Australia's infamous waterfront dispute; the shearing wide comb dispute; and the Mudginberri dispute.

The current president of the National Farmers' Federation is Fiona Simson since November 2016; the organisation's chief executive officer is Tony Mahar, since April 2016.

Key policy priorities

The NFF's key policy areas include farm business and productivity; access to markets; digital connectivity; natural resource management; biosecurity, health and welfare; education and training; and workplace relations. The NFF has been involved in a number of major policy debates in Australia, including most recently, the backpacker tax, the Murray-Darling Basin Plan, carbon tax, foreign investment, drought policy reform and livestock exports.

In February 2013, the NFF released the first Blueprint for Australian Agriculture. The blueprint is a strategic plan for the Australian agricultural sector and its supply chain, setting out its future direction. The blueprint is the first cross-industry plan for the sector, developed by the sector. In 2013, the NFF moved into the legacy phase of the blueprint: turning the blueprint document into action. The blueprint was developed with the support of Westpac, Woolworths and the Department of Agriculture, Fisheries and Forestry, with Westpac and Woolworths continuing their support into the legacy phase, along with new partners Bayer and Syngenta Australia.

In December 2015 the National Farmers Federation launched a new program to use digital technology to improve agricultural efficiency. The program comprises three components:
 An online platform that will provide "a single source for ... food and agribusiness news ... weather and market information, blogs, commentary" as well as "a stronger more unified public voice", scheduled to be available in May 2016
 The National Farmers' Digital Agriculture Service, an online service for data collation
 Sprout, an incubator program to identify and support new ideas in agribusiness developed in partnership with financial services group Findex

Background
The NFF was formed in 1979. NFF policy is set by the NFF Members' Council, which comprises the presidents of the NFF's 31member organizations

NFF's members are the state-level farmers' organizations, national commodity councils, and other affiliated members. According to the NFF charter, state-level farmers' organizations represent the interests of the agricultural sector in their respective states. Issues related to individual commodities or interstate/national farming concerns are represented by relevant national commodity councils. The NFF focuses on those policy issues that affect all farmers, regardless of location or commodity. These include such issues as farm business and productivity, access to markets, natural resource management, biosecurity, animal health and welfare, education and training and workplace relations.

NFF membership 
The NFF's 31member organizations are:

AgForce Queensland
Australian Chicken Growers' Council 
Australian Dairy Farmers
Australian Forest Products Association
Australian Livestock Exporters' Council
Australian Livestock and Property Agents Association
Animal Medicines Australia
Australian Pork Limited
Australian Veterinary Association
Beechworth Honey
CANEGROWERS
Cattle Council of Australia
Corporate Agriculture Group
Cotton Australia
Dried Fruits Australia
Future Farmers Network
Goat Industry Council of Australia
GrainCorp
GrainGrowers
Northern Territory Cattlemen's Association
NSW Farmers' Association
NSW Irrigators' Council
Pastoralists' Association of West Darling
Primary Employers Tasmania
Ridley Corporation
Ricegrowers' Association of Australia
Summerfruit Australia
Tasmanian Farmers and Graziers Association
Victorian Farmers Federation
WAFarmers
WoolProducers Australia

Office bearers

President
The following people have served as president of the National Farmers' Federation:

Chief executive officer
The following people have served as chief executive officer, or another appropriate title, of the National Farmers' Federation:

Award of Honour
The NFF Award of Honour recognizes people who have made an important contribution to the NFF and the farming sector. These include:

NFF Congress
The NFF has run its National Congress four times, in 2009, 2010, 2012 and 2014. The two first Congresses focused on modern farming, and adapting to the changing agriculture environment. In 2012, the Congress was around understanding, and capitalizing on, the food and fibre boom. The theme for the 2014 Congress was 'Producing Our Future'.

The next Congress will be held in 2016.

Australian Farmers' Fighting Fund
The Australian Farmers' Fighting Fund was created in 1985 to provide financial, legal, and professional assistance to farmers. The fund was created out of the Mudgenberri dispute in 1985, funded in part by farmers and in part by non-farming businesses. The AFFF is governed independently of the NFF and is controlled by a board of trustees, three of which are independent trustees.

The current trustees are Hugh Nivison (chairman); Peter Reith; Donald McGauchie ; Brent Finlay; Duncan Fraser; Fiona Simson; and Tony Mahar.

See also
 Agriculture in Australia
 Economy of Australia

References

External links
 National Farmers' Federation website

Agricultural organisations based in Australia